The International Exhibition and Convention Centre EXPO Kraków is an exhibition and convention centre located in Kraków, Poland. It is the largest multi-purpose facility in the south of the country. It is owned and operated by Targi w Krakowie. It was opened on 14 May 2014.
EXPO Kraków is designed to accommodate trade fairs, congresses, concerts, banquets, product presentations, theatre performances, fashion shows and sports events.

Facilities 
The total usable surface area of  includes:
 12 air-conditioned module conference rooms
 4 meeting rooms
 Lobby
 Restaurant
EXPO Kraków is also the headquarters of Targi w Krakowie. The parking lot in front of the building can accommodate more than 700 cars.

Events 
Many events have been organised at EXPO Kraków. Among those organised by Targi w Krakowie are:
 International Dental Trade Fair in Kraków
 MOTO SHOW Kraków
 Trade Fair of Mobile Solutions and Technologies Mobile-IT
 International Trade Fair of Industrial Insulation
 Winter Tourism Trade Fair
 Skiing Stations and Winter Resorts Equipment
 International Sheet Metal Working, Joining and Coating Fair
 International Trade Fair of Machine Tools, Tools, Devices and Equipment for Material Processing
 International Book Fair in Kraków
 International Trade Fair of Hotel and Catering Equipment
 Food and Drinks for Catering Trade Fair
 International Wine Trade Fair in Kraków

References

External links 
 Official website of EXPO Kraków
 Official website of Targi w Krakowie

Buildings and structures in Kraków
Convention centres in Poland
Event venues established in 2014
2014 establishments in Poland